Robert N. Saveland is an American professor emeritus of education and geography at University of Georgia. In 2012 National Council for Geographic Education have awarded him with George J. Miller Award. From 1968 to 1985 Saveland served as social science education professor at College of Education. Died Nov. 23, 2017 in Athens, GA.

Works
Geography of Missouri: A Story of the People and the Regions of "Show Me" State
A World View

References

External links
Robert N. Saveland, Elemental South: An Anthology of Southern Nature Writing (review)

Living people
American geographers
University of Georgia faculty
Year of birth missing (living people)